is a Japanese manga series written and illustrated by Hiroyuki Nishimori. It was serialized in Shogakukan's shōnen manga magazine Weekly Shōnen Sunday from May 2004 to January 2006, with its chapters collected in eight tankōbon volumes.

Publication
Dōshirō de Gozaru, written and illustrated by Hiroyuki Nishimori, was serialized in Shogakukan's shōnen manga magazine Weekly Shōnen Sunday from 12 May 2004, to 21 January 2006. Shogakukan collected its chapters in eight tankōbon volumes, released from 6 August 2004, to 17 February 2006. Shogakukan republished its chapters in a four-volume wideban edition, released from 18 October 2013, to 17 January 2014.

Volume list

References

External links
 

Comedy anime and manga
Samurai in anime and manga
Shogakukan manga
Shōnen manga